Hard Nova is a role-playing video game developed by  Malibu Interactive and published by Electronic Arts in 1990 for DOS, Amiga and Atari ST. It is a follow-up to Sentinel Worlds I: Future Magic.

Gameplay

Hard Nova has a character creation element that allows players to choose their gender, and, unlike Sentinel Worlds I, lead a group of mercenaries.

Plot

Reception
The game received 5 out of 5 stars in Dragon. Scorpia of Computer Gaming World opined in 1991 that Hard Nova greatly improved on Sentinel Worlds, and concluded that it "is a pretty decent game, with some interesting touches and a good storyline. While not a long-term epic, it should keep you occupied for awhile." Ken St. Andre wrote in the same issue of CGW that "it is a very good real-time shoot-'em-up game", but that the combat became boring and amoral and the game offered little exploration. In 1993 Scorpia stated that Hard Nova was "definitely worth your attention if you like space games".

Reviews
ASM (Aktueller Software Markt) (Dec, 1990)
Australian Commodore and Amiga Review (Feb, 1992)
Amiga Action (Dec, 1991)
ASM (Aktueller Software Markt) (Dec, 1991)
Info (Jan, 1992)
Atari ST User (Dec, 1991)
Joker Verlag präsentiert: Sonderheft (1992)
Amiga Joker (Nov, 1991)
ST Format (Jan, 1992)
CU Amiga (Dec, 1991)
Amiga Format (Nov, 1991)

References

External links
 

1990 video games
Amiga games
Atari ST games
DOS games
Electronic Arts games
Malibu Interactive games
Role-playing video games
Science fiction video games
Video games featuring protagonists of selectable gender
Video games developed in the United States